F64, F-64, f64, or f/64 may refer to:
 Group f/64, a 1932 group of San Francisco photographers
 HMS Kingston (F64), a 1939 British Royal Navy K-class destroyer
 Gender identity disorder's ICD-10 code
 Famicom 64, an alternate name of a Japanese version of Nintendo 64
 Double-precision floating-point format, as it's known by its type annotation  in Rust.